The Contarini Madonna (Italian: Madonna Contarini) is an   oil painting by the Italian Renaissance master Giovanni Bellini, dating from c. 1475–1480 now in the Gallerie dell'Accademia in Venice.

Description
The painting shows the Madonna holding Jesus who stands on a parapet in the foreground. Below is a cartouche with the artist's signature,  IOANNES BELLINVS. The blessing Child has similar features to that in the San Giobbe Altarpiece, dating to the same decade or a few years later. His icon-like staring appearance recalls the Byzantine painting, which was one of the roots of the Venetian painting school. 

The background is formed by a soft landscape, with hills and a city with towers.

See also
San Giobbe Altarpiece

Sources

Paintings of the Madonna and Child by Giovanni Bellini
1470s paintings
1480s paintings
Paintings in the Gallerie dell'Accademia